is a passenger railway station  located in the town of Hokuei, Tottori Prefecture, Japan. It is operated by the West Japan Railway Company (JR West).

Lines

Station layout
The station consists of one ground-level island platform connected by a level crossing to the station building. Trains bound for Tottori arrive and depart from the platform on the station building side, and trains bound for Yonago arrive and depart from the platform on the opposite side. The station is unattended.

Platforms

Adjacent stations
West Japan Railway Company (JR West)

History
Shimohōjō Station opened on March 10, 1915. With the privatization of the Japan National Railways (JNR) on April 1, 1987, the station came under the aegis of the West Japan Railway Company.

Passenger statistics
In fiscal 2018, the station was used by an average of 140 passengers daily.

Surrounding area
Hojo Yubara Road Hokuei IC
Japan National Route 313
Tottori Prefectural Route 201

See also
List of railway stations in Japan

References

External links 

 Shimohōjō Station from JR-Odekake.net 

Railway stations in Tottori Prefecture
Stations of West Japan Railway Company
Sanin Main Line
Railway stations in Japan opened in 1915
Hokuei, Tottori